Valco San Paolo is an urban area 11B of Rome City Hall (Former City Hall Rome XI) of Rome Capital. It extends to Q. X Ostiense, occupying a river Tiber river.

Monuments and Places of Interest

Civil Architectures 
 INA Casa and IACP district, between Via San Paolo, Via Corinto, via Efeso and via Filomene. Buildings of the 20th century (1949-50). 41.853076 ° N 12.474327 ° E
 Complex INA-Home and IACP social housing with four stellar towers. Projects by architects Mario De Renzi , Saverio Muratori , Eugenio Montuori , Mario Paniconi , Giulio Pediconi and Fernando Puccioni .

Religious Architecture 
 St. Paul's Basilica outside the walls, on Via Ostiense. Patriarchal Basilica.

References 

 The new INA House in San Paolo in Rome , Domus , No. 251, Rozzano, Editoriale Domus, October 1950
 Piero Ostilio Rossi and Ilaria Gatti, Rome. Modern Architecture Guide. 1909-2000 , 3rd ed., Rome, Laterza, 2003, pp. 174-175, .

Subdivisions of Rome
Rome Q. X Ostiense